Betley is a civil parish in the district of Newcastle-under-Lyme, Staffordshire, England.  It contains 40 listed buildings that are recorded in the National Heritage List for England.  Of these, one is listed at Grade I, the highest of the three grades, four are at Grade II*, the middle grade, and the others are at Grade II, the lowest grade.  The parish contains the villages of Betley, Ravenshall, and Wrinehill, and the surrounding countryside.  The listed buildings are adjacent to, or near, the A531 road, and most are houses and associated structures, cottages, farmhouses and farm buildings, the earliest of which are timber framed or have timber-framed cores.  The other listed buildings are bridges, a public house, mileposts, and a telephone kiosk.


Key

Buildings

References

Citations

Sources

Lists of listed buildings in Staffordshire
Borough of Newcastle-under-Lyme